Tompkins Township is located in Warren County, Illinois, United States. As of the 2010 census, its population was 918 and it contained 403 housing units.

The village of Kirkwood is located in this township.

Geography

Demographics

References

External links
City-data.com
Illinois State Archives

Townships in Warren County, Illinois
Townships in Illinois